The 2018 Columbus Challenger was a professional tennis tournament played on indoor hard courts. It was the fifth edition of the tournament which was part of the 2018 ATP Challenger Tour. It took place in Columbus, United States between 17 and 23 September 2018.

Singles main draw entrants

Seeds

 1 Rankings are as of September 10, 2018.

Other entrants
The following players received entry into the singles main draw as wildcards:
  Martin Joyce
  John McNally
  Mikael Torpegaard
  J. J. Wolf

The following player received entry into the singles main draw as a special exempt:
  James Duckworth

The following players received entry from the qualifying draw:
  Thai-Son Kwiatkowski
  Luke Saville
  Ryan Shane
  Evan Song

The following player received entry as a lucky loser:
  David Pérez Sanz

Champions

Singles

 Michael Mmoh def.  Jordan Thompson 6–3, 7–6(7–4).

Doubles

 Tommy Paul /  Peter Polansky def.  Gonzalo Escobar /  Roberto Quiroz 6–3, 6–3.

External links
 Official website

Columbus Challenger